The Rizal Monument (original title: Motto Stella; Latin: "guiding star") is a memorial in Rizal Park in Manila, Philippines built to commemorate the executed Filipino nationalist, José Rizal. The monument consists of a standing bronze sculpture of Rizal, with an obelisk, set on a stone base within which his remains are interred, holding his 2 famous novels "El Filibusterismo and Noli Me Tangere". A plaque on the pedestal's front reads: "To the memory of José Rizal, patriot and martyr, executed on Bagumbayan Field December 30 1896. This monument is dedicated by the people of the Philippine Islands."

The perimeter of the monument is guarded continuously by the Philippine Marine Corps’ Marine Security and Escort Group, the changing of the guard having become a daily ritual. The landmark is the most recognizable monument in Luneta. The Rizal Monument serves a meaningful national heritage for Filipinos, commemorating the heroic act of Jose Rizal to his country.

A near-exact replica of the Rizal Monument can be found in Madrid, Spain at the junction of Avenida de Las Islas Filipinas and Calle Santander.

Symbolism 

There is also an official explanation of the meaning of the monument's details. The monument depicts Rizal in an overcoat holding a book, that has the title "NOLI ME TÁNGERE" inscribed. This is contrary to the usual representation of the book as a symbol of both the inscribed novel and its sequel El Filibusterismo, as well as Rizal's annotation of Antonio de Morga's Sucesos de las Islas Filipinas. The obelisk is usually taken to mean Rizal's masonic background while the three stars are said to stand for Luzon, the Visayas and Mindanao. The figures at the back of the monument, such as leaves and a pot, are said to symbolize the country's natural resources. The consensus is that the figures beside Rizal—a mother rearing her child and two young boys reading—signify family and education.

History 

The Rizal Monument was planned and constructed during the American colonial period of the Philippines in the early 20th century.

Act No. 243 

On September 28, 1901, the United States Philippine Commission approved Act No. 243, that granted the right to use public land upon the Luneta in the city of Manila, where the monument was erected to commemorate the memory of José Rizal, Philippine patriot, writer, and poet.  The act stated that the monument would not only bear a statue of the hero, but would also house his remains.  The act also created a committee on the Rizal monument that consisted of Pascual Poblete, Paciano Rizal (José's brother), Juan Tuason, Teodoro R. Yangco, Mariano Limjap, Máximo Paterno, Ramón Genato, Tomás G. del Rosario, and Ariston Bautista. The members were tasked, among others, with raising funds through popular subscriptions.

Design competition 
The committee held an international design competition between 1905–1907 and invited sculptors from Europe and the United States to submit entries with material preference produced in the archipelago.  The estimated cost of the monument was ₱100,000. The insular government donated ₱30,000 for the fund.  By January 1905, that goal had been oversubscribed. When the campaign closed in August 1912, the amount collected had reached ₱135,195.61.

Winner announced 

On January 8, 1908, the judging committee composed of then Governor-General James F. Smith, John T. MacLeod, and Máximo M. Paterno, officially announced its decision through the press. The first-prize winner was Carlo Nicoli of Carrara, Italy for his scaled plaster model titled "Al Mártir de Bagumbayan" (To the Martyr of Bagumbayan) besting 40 other accepted entries. The base was to be rendered in two shades of gray marble while the pedestal, in two shades of white marble. Among his other plans were the use of marble from Italy and the incorporation of more elaborate figurative elements.

Controversies 
The contract was awarded to second-placer Swiss sculptor named Richard Kissling for his "Motto Stella" (Guiding Star).   Many accounts explained why the contract landed to Kissling, one is Nicoli's inability to post the required performance bond of ₱20,000 for the duration of the monument's construction. Some sources say that Nicoli failed to show up at the designated date for the signing of the job contract. Another narrative declared Kissling's quotation was lower than that of Nicoli. A complaint was reportedly filed by Nicoli through the courts of justice.

Some of the local press lambasted Kissling's model. It was satirized in a cartoon and labeled vulgar y tosco, meaning "lousy". The constituents of the Jury of Awards – none of whom were artists, architects nor engineers – were also questioned.  There were plans for the famous Filipino painter Félix Resurrección Hidalgo to inspect and modify the design. However, the latter was ultimately left "as it is" since the bronze of the statues had already been cast in Switzerland.

Dedication 

More than twelve years after the Philippine Commissions approval of the Act, the shrine was finally unveiled on December 30, 1913 during Rizal's 17th death anniversary. The remains of Rizal interred in the monument which consisted of bones because after his execution, he was secretly buried without a coffin at Paco Cemetery. There was an account of how his sister Narcisa ultimately discovered the burial site and how she bribed the caretaker to mark the site with RPJ—Rizal's initials in reverse.
His poem, now popularly known as "Mi Último Adiós" ("My Last Farewell") is inscribed on the memorial plaque.

World War II 
During World War II in 1943, the Japanese government issued "invasion money" to occupied territories in the Pacific area of operations, one of which was the Philippines. Out of three series, the second was issued in 1, 5, 10, and 100 pesos only. All have the Rizal Monument vignette on the banknote.

Steel pylon 

In Rizal's birth centenary year of 1961, a stainless steel pylon was superimposed over the granite obelisk, increasing the structure's height from 12.7 meters to 30.5 meters. The remodeling undertaken by the Jose Rizal National Centennial Commission (JRNCC) was widely criticized. Many found the gleaming modern steel shaft incompatible with the somber granite base. Moreover, the latter seemed to dwarf the much smaller Rizal figure. Others simply disliked the idea of tampering with a popular and traditional image.

The designer of the remodeling was Juan Nakpil, who later became the country's first National Artist for Architecture. He quoted former Secretary of Education and JRNCC chair Manuel Lim as envisioning the pylon as a convenient reference point for incoming boats, and for people lost around the city.

The ₱145,000 shaft was removed two years later under the request of Secretary of Education Alejandro Roces and Director of Public Libraries Carlos Quirino. It was dismantled during Holy Week, reportedly to prevent any court injunction from restraining them as government offices were closed during holidays.  The pylon was relocated to the median of the Baclaran section of Roxas Boulevard. But since 1995, the steel pylon had disappeared and its fate remains unknown.

Management 
Rizal Monument, as well as Rizal Park, is administered by the National Parks Development Committee, an attached agency of the Department of Tourism.

Gallery

See also 
 Rizal Monument (Daet)

References

External links 

 The Official Government Portal of the Republic of the Philippines
 National Parks Development Committee – Rizal Park
 History of Rizal Monument

Monument
National monuments of the Philippines
Monuments and memorials in Metro Manila
Buildings and structures in Ermita
Cultural Properties of the Philippines in Metro Manila
Obelisks